Mestolobes arctura is a moth of the family Crambidae described by Edward Meyrick in 1899. It is endemic to the Hawaiian island of Molokai.

Females have a remarkable, large, broad, apically truncated, heavy mass of black hair-scales, which resemble a shaving brush, at the apex of the abdomen.

External links

Crambinae
Taxa named by Edward Meyrick
Endemic moths of Hawaii
Biota of Molokai
Moths described in 1899